BR-122 is a federal highway of Brazil. The 1839.7 kilometre road connects Chorozinho (near Fortaleza), Ceará to Montes Claros, Minas Gerais.

References 

Federal highways in Brazil